Cofimpacia is a genus of moths of the family Erebidae. The genus was erected by Jeremy Daniel Holloway in 1979.

Species
Cofimpacia chusaroides Holloway, 1979
Cofimpacia luteata Holloway, 1979
Cofimpacia violacea Holloway, 1979

References

Calpinae